Qualifying rounds for the 2008 CONCACAF Men's Pre-Olympic Tournament were held for the Central American and the Caribbean zones, narrowing the field from each zone to three nations and two nations, respectively.

In the following tables:

 P = total games played
 W = total games won
 D = total games drawn (tied)
 L = total games lost
 GF = total goals scored (goals for)
 GA = total goals conceded (goals against)
 Pts = total points accumulated

North American zone
The 3 members of the North American zone automatically qualified to the final round:

Central American zone
Six teams were divided into two groups of three, or triangulars, and played a round of matches in round-robin format. The winner of each triangular advanced to the finals, and the runners-up played each other in a home-and-away playoff.

Triangular 1

Triangular 2

Play-off

The runners-up of each triangular met in a play-off to qualify for a spot in the final round.

Panama 1–1 Costa Rica on aggregate. Panama won 4–3 on penalties.

Caribbean zone
The Caribbean zone qualifiers were divided into two rounds. In the first round, 22 teams were divided into six groups, Groups A through F, and the six group winners advanced to the second round. The six second round teams were divided into two groups of three, Groups G and H, and the winners advanced to the finals.

First round

Group A - Paramaribo, Suriname

August 31, 2007

September 2, 2007

September 4, 2007

Group B - Oranjestad, Aruba

September 9, 2007

September 11, 2007

September 13, 2007

Group C - Havana, Cuba

September 9, 2007

September 11, 2007

September 13, 2007

Group D - Basseterre, St. Kitts and Nevis

September 9, 2007

September 11, 2007

September 13, 2007

Group E - Kingstown, St. Vincent and the Grenadines

September 9, 2007

September 11, 2007

September 13, 2007

Group F - Nassau, Bahamas

September 2, 2007

 The British Virgin Islands withdrew at the last minute, leaving the Bahamas as the group champion.

Second round

Group G

Group H

References 

2008 CONCACAF Men's Pre-Olympic Tournament